The Lifan Xuanlang (轩朗) is a 7-seater MPV produced by Lifan for the Chinese market.

Overview 

The Lifan Xuanlang was unveiled on the 2016 Guangzhou Auto Show in China and was priced from 69,800 yuan to 106,800 yuan at launch. 

Styling of the Lifan Xuanlang was controversial as the exterior design of the Lifan Xuanlang was heavily inspired by the 2015 Ford S-Max.

References

External links 

Lifan Motors website

Xuanlang
Minivans
Front-wheel-drive vehicles
Cars introduced in 2016
2010s cars
Cars of China